The following is a list of the 50 municipalities (comuni) of the Province of Pordenone, Friuli-Venezia Giulia, Italy.

List

See also 
List of municipalities of Italy

References 

Pordenone